The 2018–19 North Carolina Central Eagles men's basketball team represented North Carolina Central University in the 2018–19 NCAA Division I men's basketball season. They played their home games at McDougald–McLendon Gymnasium in Durham, North Carolina, and were led by 10th-year head coach LeVelle Moton. They finished the season 18-16, to finish a tie for 3rd place. In the MEAC tournament, they defeated Delaware State, North Carolina A&T, and Norfolk State to win the MEAC Tournament. Therefore, they received an automatic bid to the NCAA tournament as a 16th seed. However, they lost to fellow 16th seed North Dakota State in the First Four.

Previous season
The Eagles finished the 2017–18 season 19–16, 9–7 in MEAC play to finish sixth place. In the MEAC tournament, they defeated Coppin State, Savannah State, and Morgan State to advance to the championship game against Hampton, which they won, to receive the conference's automatic bid to the NCAA tournament for the second consecutive year. As a No. 16 seed, they lost in the First Four to Texas Southern.

Roster

Schedule and results

|-
!colspan=12 style=| Non-Conference Regular season

|-
!colspan=12 style=| MEAC regular season

|-
!colspan=12 style=| MEAC tournament
|-

|-
!colspan=9 style=| NCAA tournament

Source

References

North Carolina Central Eagles men's basketball seasons
North Carolina Central Eagles
North Carolina Central Eagles men's basketball team
North Carolina Central Eagles men's basketball team
North Carolina Central